The Lloyds Bank National Business Awards were an annual British awards ceremony recognising achievement among businesses headquartered in the United Kingdom, held from 2002 to 2020. They comprised a programme of networking and judging events culminating in a black-tie dinner at the Grosvenor House Hotel in Mayfair, London. The awards once called "the Oscars of great British business" by former prime minister David Cameron. but were closed by owners Informa Markets after a change in direction by the information company post Covid pandemic.

In 2019 it featured over 140 finalists across fifteen categories, covering business innovation, growth, entrepreneurship, employment, data, artificial intelligence and corporate social responsibility. Among the winners were entrepreneurs James Timpson and Sara Davies.

Categories 
It awards prizes in the following categories:

 The Lloyds Bank Exporter Award
 The Lloyds Bank Mid-Market Business Award
 The Lloyds Bank New Business Award
 The Lloyds Bank Small to Medium-Sized Business Award
 The Lloyds Bank Positive Social Impact Award
 The Castle Corporate Finance Scale-Up Business Award
 The Data Excellence Award
 The Give a Grad a Go Employer Award
 The Inflexion Entrepreneur of the Year Award
 The LDC Growth Through Innovation Award
 The Virgin Atlantic Customer Experience & Loyalty Award
 The Artificial Intelligence Award
 The Business Enabler of the Year Award
 The New Entrepreneur of the Year Award
 The Leader of the Year Award

References

External links
 

Business and industry awards